"Sista morgonen" is a song by Swedish singer-songwriter Niklas Strömstedt from his third studio album, En gång i livet (1989).

Cover versions 

In 2015, Swedish singer Miriam Bryant released an English version of the song entitled "One Last Time". This version peaked at number 4 on the Sverigetopplistan chart.

Track listing and formats 

 Swedish 7-inch single

A. "Sista morgonen" – 3:22
B. "Andra sidan midnatt" – 4:43

Credits and personnel 

 Niklas Strömstedt – songwriter, producer, vocals
 Björn Boström – engineering
 Björn Norén – engineering
 Anders Herrlin – engineering
 Alar Suurna – mixing
 Mattias Edwall – cover art, photographer
 Sven Dolling – cover art designer

Credits and personnel adopted from the En gång i livet album and 7-inch single liner notes.

Charts

Weekly charts

Certifications

References

External links 

 

1980s ballads
1988 songs
1988 singles
EMI Records singles
Niklas Strömstedt songs
Songs written by Niklas Strömstedt
Swedish-language songs